RC-48 was a steel roller coaster built by Pinfari. This ride is the only installation of the model ever produced, as Pinfari went bankrupt shortly after its release. The ride operated on Morey's Pier's Surfside Pier from 2000 until 2004. The RC-48 replaced the retired Jet Star attraction in 2000.

The RC-48 was purchased by Wade Shows, Inc.  During 2008, it was present at the Michigan State Fair, Oklahoma State Fair, North Carolina State Fair and perhaps others.  During February 2010 it was still traveling with Wade Shows when it appeared at the Florida State Fair.

Ride layout
The train makes a loose turn out of the station and up a steep 70-foot (21 m) lift hill. It then proceeds down a banked twisting drop and into the first of three over-banked curves. At the base of the third over-banked curve, the track stays moderately banked and around a 3.0 g helix. The track levels and pulls into the station.

Morey's Piers
Former roller coasters in New Jersey
Portable roller coasters